Jan Apell and Jonas Björkman were the defending champions but lost in the final 7–6, 6–4 against Todd Martin and Pete Sampras.

Seeds
The top four seeded teams received byes into the second round.

Draw

Finals

Top half

Bottom half

External links
 1995 Stella Artois Championships Doubles Draw

Doubles